Battle of Kilinochchi may refer to:

Battle of Kilinochchi (1998), occurred in September 1998 for the control of the city of Kilinochchi in Sri Lanka
Battle of Kilinochchi (2008–2009), lasted between November 2008 and January 2009 as part of the 2008 SLA Northern offensive